The Flotilla Effect is an examination of how smaller nations fare in a globalised economy, the impact the Great Recession had on smaller nations and what advantages and disadvantages smaller independent nations have economically.

Concept and discussion

Original conception 
The concept was first introduced by Adam Price and Ben Levinger on behalf on the Green-EFA group in the European Parliament. While at Harvard University, they released an article titled The Flotilla Effect: Europe’s small economies through the eye of the storm. This report gained attention in the media, particularly the national media in Wales.

Scholarly references 
The report has also been discussed in scholarly articles, including in the context of improving the welfare state, devolution in Wales and in a publication by Cardiff University's Wales Fiscal Analysis in the context of fiscal policy in Wales.

Independence 
The flotilla effect also gained some attention, following Plaid Cymru leader at the time, Leanne Wood's proposals for a debate on Welsh independence in the wake of the 2014 Scottish independence referendum.

Wales 
Owen Donovan published in his blog "State of Wales" that he would revisit the idea in October 2017 and came to two main conclusions. There is indeed no link between larger countries or population and increased proportional economic growth and there is no such phenomenon as a country being "too small" for independence. There is a correlation between a country's openness to trade and its economic growth which is true for all sizes of countries. There is also a trend that smaller nations tend to have better prospects for economic growth when these countries are open to trade.

Donovan also notes two matters that are not addressed in full in the original concept report, the first being whether the United Kingdom has hampered economic growth in Wales, although the evidence suggests that this is indeed the case. The second matter is that the report does not evaluate the economic prospects of a potentially newly independent state such as Wales and whether Wales would be better off or not.

Plaid Cymru 
Ioan Bellin, a Plaid Cymru candidate has discussed the benefits of the flotilla effect via the Institute of Welsh Affairs.

Jonathan Edwards, Plaid Cymru MP, has also outlined benefits of small country economics and the flotilla effect via HUFFPOST.

Scotland 
Adam Ramsay of Open Democracy UK states that the Flotilla effect is an additional argument in favour of Scottish independence. He suggests that small European countries have a tendency to be more prosperous than larger countries with a greater Gross domestic product (GDP) per head. He justifies the mechanism behind this phenomenon by suggesting that governments of smaller countries are able to use economic policy in a more subtle manner, and can adapt faster to changing circumstances.

References 

 
Politics of Wales